Taylor Site is a historic archaeological site located near Cayce, Lexington County, South Carolina. The site contains the remains of settlements that begins with Paleo-Indian and extends into and through the Archaic and into the early Woodland period.

It was listed on the National Register of Historic Places in 1974.

References 

Archaeological sites on the National Register of Historic Places in South Carolina
Buildings and structures in Lexington County, South Carolina
National Register of Historic Places in Lexington County, South Carolina